Sainte-Séraphine is a parish municipality located in the Centre-du-Québec region of Quebec, Canada.

Demographics 

References

Parish municipalities in Quebec
Incorporated places in Centre-du-Québec